Kansas City Power & Light may refer to:

 Kansas City Power and Light Company, an electric provider.
 The Kansas City Power & Light District, a downtown redevelopment area.
 The Kansas City Power and Light Building, a skyscraper.